MSC Nuria is a container ship built in 2008 by the Daewoo Mangalia Heavy Industries in Mangalia, Romania and currently operated by Mediterranean Shipping Company S.A. She is the largest container ship ever constructed in Romania.
The  ship has a container capacity of 4,860 TEU's.

The Mediterranean Shipping Company S.A. also had a previous ship called MSC Nuria built in 1977 as the Australian Venture and operated under Saint Kitts and Nevis flag that was discharged in 2006.

References

External links
MSC Nuria

Container ships
Ships built in Romania
2008 ships